The following is a list of the 17 cantons of the Jura department, in France, following the French canton reorganisation which came into effect in March 2015:

 Arbois
 Authume
 Bletterans
 Champagnole
 Coteaux du Lizon
 Dole-1
 Dole-2
 Hauts de Bienne
 Lons-le-Saunier-1
 Lons-le-Saunier-2
 Moirans-en-Montagne
 Mont-sous-Vaudrey
 Poligny
 Saint-Amour
 Saint-Claude
 Saint-Laurent-en-Grandvaux
 Tavaux

References